A party is a social gathering.

Party may also refer to:

 Political party, an organized group of people with same ideology who field candidates for elections
Lists of political parties
 Party (law), a person or group of persons composing a single entity for the purposes of the law

Film, television, radio and theatre
 Party (1984 film), a Hindi-language film
 Party (1994 film), an American short film
 Party (1996 film), a Portuguese-French comedy-drama
 Party (2001 film), an Iranian film starring Hedieh Tehrani
 Party (2006 film), a Telugu-language comedy film
 Party (2018 film), a Marathi-language film
 Party (2019 film), a Tamil-language comedy film
 "Party", a 1995 episode of Beavis and Butt-Head
 "Party", a 2007 episode of The Mighty Boosh
 "Party!", a 1986 episode of Pee-wee's Playhouse
 "Party", a 2001 episode of the sitcom Undergrads
 Party, a stage play by Tom Basden
 Party (radio series), a BBC Radio 4 sitcom adapted from the play

Music

Albums
 Party (Iggy Pop album), 1981
 Party (Nick Swardson album), 2007
 Party (Pet Shop Boys album), 2009
 Party (Aldous Harding album), 2017
 Party, by Bloodstone, 1984
 Party, by Yellowman, 1991
 Beach Boys' Party!, by The Beach Boys, 1967

Songs
 "Party" (Beyoncé song), 2011
 "Party" (The Blue Hearts song), 1993
 "Party" (Chris Brown song), 2016
 "Party" (Christine Anu song), 1995
 "Party" (Girls' Generation song), 2015
 "Party" (JP Cooper song), 2016
 "Party" (Ofenbach and Lack of Afro song), 2017
 "Party" (Paulo Londra song), 2019
 "Party" (Ringo Starr song), unreleased
 "Party", a song by Adore Delano from the 2014 album Till Death Do Us Party
 "Party", a song by Boston from the 1978 album Don't Look Back
 "Party", a song by The D4, from the 2001 album 6twenty
 "Party", a song by Demi Lovato, from the 2008 album Don't Forget
 "Party", a song by DJ Mustard, from the 2016 album Cold Summer
 "Party", a song by Elvis Presley, from the 1957 album Loving You 
 "Party", a song by Kris Kross, from the 1992 album Totally Krossed Out
 "Party", a song by Michael Learns to Rock, from the 1997 album Nothing to Lose
 "Party", a song by David Jones and Steve Pitts, from the 1987 album, Missing Links
 "Party", a song by Queen, from the 1989 album The Miracle
 "Party (Follow Me)", a song by Hyuna from the 2017 EP Following
 "Party", a song by Bad Bunny and Rauw Alejandro from the 2022 album Un Verano Sin Ti

Other uses
 Party (magazine), a Chinese literary magazine 
 Party (role-playing games), a group of characters adventuring together in a game
 Party (Sydney newspaper), by the Communist Party of Australia from June 1942
 Party, a partition of the field in heraldry
 Party, a playable game mode in Nintendo’s Mario Party franchise
 PARTY Program (Prevent Alcohol and Risk Related Trauma in Youth), an international health promotion program
 PARTIES (Protected Area Run Time Interface Extension Services), in computing

See also

 Parti (disambiguation)
 Partial (disambiguation)
 First party (disambiguation)
 Third party (disambiguation)
 The Party (disambiguation)
 Pity Party (disambiguation)
 Shower (disambiguation)